Nicholas de Ewelme was an English medieval university chancellor.

From 1267 to 1269, Nicholas de Ewelm was Chancellor of the University of Oxford.

See also
 Ewelme

References

Year of birth unknown
Year of death unknown
Chancellors of the University of Oxford
13th-century English people